Breeze Airways is an American low-cost airline headquartered in Cottonwood Heights, Utah. The airline was founded by David Neeleman, who previously co-founded Morris Air, WestJet, JetBlue, and Azul Linhas Aereas. Breeze's operations launched on May 27, 2021, with its inaugural flight from Tampa International Airport to Charleston International Airport.

History 
In June 2018, Neeleman planned for the establishment of a new American airline under the tentative name "Moxy Airways," with capital from former Air Canada CEO Robert Milton, former ILFC CEO Henri Courpron, former JetBlue board chairman Michael Lazarus, and himself. They perceived that due to consolidation, all 11 major carriers in the country were profitable and had existed 20 years ago (except JetBlue, which Neeleman had co-founded in 2000) and that there was space for a new airline competitor. They also determined that the country's four largest airlines carried 80% of domestic US seats in 2017, and that due to the loss of service to smaller markets, US domestic air capacity had remained stagnant from 2007 to 2017 while the economy had expanded by 34%.

To fill this perceived gap, the airline planned to offer point-to-point flights from smaller, secondary airports such as Norfolk International Airport, Westchester County Airport, or Providence's then-named T. F. Green Airport, bypassing larger airline hubs for shorter travel times. The airline was also reportedly considering longer distance flights to South America and Europe.
It would offer spacious seats and free Wi-Fi, like Azul and JetBlue, but charge fees for snacks and advance seat assignments, like ultra low-cost carriers Allegiant Air or Spirit Airlines.
For the launch of operations, 60 Bombardier CS300s (later known as the Airbus A220-300) were ordered, soliciting Chinese lessors to finance 18 to be delivered from 2021 onward. However, in order to accelerate the airline's launch, it initially planned to utilize secondhand Embraer 195 aircraft from Azul in order to launch as soon as 2020.

On February 7, 2020, it was announced that the airline had officially been named Breeze Airways, as the previous "Moxy" name clashed with Marriott's "Moxy Hotels" trademark. The airline's branding, such as its logo, colors and aircraft livery, was developed by the Brazilian airline marketing specialist Gianfranco "Panda" Beting, Azul's co-founder, who was also responsible for creating the branding of Azul, TAP Air Portugal and Transbrasil. Additionally, Neeleman expressed the view that the airline would be known as the "World's Nicest Airline". On February 20, 2020, the airline established its headquarters in Cottonwood Heights, Utah.

Breeze had originally planned to begin operations sometime in 2020 through the acquisition of Compass Airlines, though the launch was later pushed back to 2021, with the acquisition being cancelled. Additionally, the airline planned to introduce Embraer 190 and 195 aircraft to launch short-haul, regional services prior to the induction of the Airbus A220-300 for longer flights. On March 10, 2021, the airline received federal approval from the United States Department of Transportation to begin operations, and was later issued its air operator's certificate on May 14, 2021. The following week, Breeze began selling tickets on May 21, 2021, with flights planned to start on May 27, 2021. In the initial years following launch, the airline's network expanded consisting of several domestic short-haul and transcontinental routes within the United States, as well as charter operations.

Destinations

Breeze operates a network consisting of domestic routes within the United States.

Fleet

, Breeze Airways operates the following aircraft:

Fleet development 
On July 17, 2018, the airline signed a memorandum of understanding with Airbus for 60 A220-300 aircraft to be delivered from 2021, with the order firmed in January 2019. The order included options for 60 additional A220s. Following the airline's revised plans to launch operations before the delivery of its A220 aircraft, Breeze agreed to sublease up to 30 Embraer 195s from Azul in order to serve short-haul routes, although the total number received was dependent on LOT Polish Airlines exercising its lease options. The airline additionally agreed to lease up to fifteen Embraer 190s from Nordic Aviation Capital. The airline received its first Embraer 195 on December 30, 2020, and later its first Embraer 190 in February 2021.

On April 26, 2021, it was announced that Breeze had ordered an additional 20 A220-300 aircraft, bringing its total orders up to 80 aircraft of the type, although Airbus listed the order under an undisclosed customer. Breeze itself did not announce the order until September 13, 2021, when it was also announced that the order was the result of exercising purchase options. The airline's first Airbus A220-300 was delivered on October 26, 2021, with the aircraft entering service on May 25, 2022.

Cabin and services

Services
Breeze had proposed intentions to offer both a low-cost and a first-class product, in contrast to the traditional all-economy business model of most low-cost carriers (LCCs). Proposals included some common LCC features such as a point-to-point route network, extra fees for additional services, and initially a single aircraft type, but the airline did not intend to operate only a single cabin class of service. Additionally, its aircraft would not feature seatback screens for its in-flight entertainment, instead opting to offer streaming of entertainment through personal electronic devices.

In August 2021, Breeze announced plans for a no-frills "Nice" ticket, and a "Nicer" ticket type offering food, extra legroom and other amenity upgrades. The carrier also announced that all ticket types were eligible for itinerary changes without additional fees. Breeze announced a "Nicest" ticket type with the delivery of its Airbus A220-300 in October 2021, which would feature a first class seat and services, and launch with the aircraft's entry into service during 2022. In March 2022, the airline announced that it planned to offer inflight Viasat Wi-Fi internet access from October 2022, however this was delayed to 2023.

Seating
Breeze's first class seats are only available on its Airbus A220 aircraft, and are configured in a 2–2 layout. The airline's Extra Legroom and Standard seats are its economy class product, the seats of which are configured in a 2–3 layout on the A220, and a 2–2 layout on the Embraer 190 and 195 aircraft. The airline additionally announced an alternative seating configuration for its A220s depending on route or seasonal demand, with fewer First Class seats and additional Extra Legroom seats.

Frequent-flyer program
BreezePoints are both the airline's frequent-flyer program as well as its travel credit system. The program is a revenue-based accrual system where passengers earn points based on the cash amount spent on travel, including base fare amounts and ancillary fees such as seat selection or baggage allowances. The amount of points earned can also vary based on the ticket type purchased. Points can be redeemed towards payments made with the airline, and expire two years after originally issued.

References

Further reading

External links 

 

Low-cost carriers
Airlines established in 2018
American companies established in 2018
Companies based in Salt Lake County, Utah
Airlines based in Utah